The 1951 Swiss Grand Prix was a Formula One motor race held on 27 May 1951 in Bern. The race was contested over 42 laps of the Bremgarten Circuit with it also being the opening race of the 1951 World Championship of Drivers. The race was the eleventh time that the Swiss Grand Prix was held with all of the races being held at Bremgarten. 

After claiming pole position for the race, Argentine driver, Juan Manuel Fangio would go on win the race by 55 seconds over Italian driver, Piero Taruffi who drove for Ferrari. Fellow Italian driver, Nino Farina rounded out the podium in the second Alfa Romeo car.

Report
The Swiss Grand Prix, the first event of the 1951 World Championship due to the absence of Monaco from the calendar, saw the Alfa Romeo team continue their dominance of the previous season. All four of their drivers occupied positions on the front two rows of the grid; the highest non-Alfa qualifier was Ferrari's Luigi Villoresi, who was alongside Fangio and Farina on the front row.

The race took place in the rain, with Fangio initially leading from Farina. Ferrari's Piero Taruffi also challenged for the lead, having started from sixth on the grid. Fangio pitted, handing Nino Farina the lead for the 24th lap of the race. However, Farina's decision not to make a pitstop did not pay off, as Fangio was able to retake the lead on lap 29. Fangio maintained the lead for the remainder of the race, eventually winning by nearly a minute from Taruffi, who had overtaken Farina on the penultimate lap. This was Taruffi's first podium in just his second championship race. The remaining Alfa drivers—Consalvo Sanesi and Toulo de Graffenried—completed the points paying positions, ahead of Ferrari's Alberto Ascari, who competed despite suffering from burns from the previous weekend's Formula 2 race in Genoa. Stirling Moss, driving for HWM, was in seventh, but ran out of fuel on the final lap, therefore yielding the position to Louis Chiron, who was driving a Maserati for Enrico Platé.

Entries

 — Consalvo Sanesi qualified and drove the entirety of the race in the #28 Alfa Romeo. Gianbattista Guidotti, named substitute driver, was not used during the Grand Prix.
 — Francis Rochat, Maurice Trintignant and André Simon all withdrew from the event prior to practice. Robert Manzon, who was entered in the #48 Simca Gordini alongside Trintignant, also withdrew.

Classification

Qualifying

Race

Notes
 – Includes 1 point for fastest lap

Championship standings after the race 
Drivers' Championship standings

Note: Only the top five positions are included. Only the best 4 results counted toward the Championship.

References

Swiss Grand Prix
Swiss Grand Prix
Grand Prix
Swiss Grand Prix